David Silver may refer to:

 David Silver (Beverly Hills, 90210), a character on the TV series Beverly Hills, 90210
 David Silver (drummer), American musician, drummer of Season to Risk and Offworld
 David Silver (programmer) (born 1976), researcher at DeepMind and professor of computer science at University College London
 David Silver (roboticist)

See also
 David Silvers (born 1979), American politician